The Right to Live may refer to:

 The Right to Live (1921 film), a British silent drama
 The Right to Live (1927 film), a German silent film
 The Right to Live (1933 film), a British crime film
 The Right to Live (1935 film), an American drama